Bollate is a comune (municipality) in the Metropolitan City of Milan in the Italian region Lombardy, located about  northwest of Milan.

As of 30 November 2017, it had a population of 36,488.  
 
Bollate borders the following municipalities: Paderno Dugnano, Senago, Garbagnate Milanese, Arese, Cormano, Novate Milanese, Baranzate, Milan.

Bollate received the honorary title of city with a presidential decree on October 11, 1984.

It is served by Bollate Centro railway station and Bollate Nord railway station. Sights include the historical Villa Arconati.

References

External links
 Official website